Bukit Batok Nature Park is a  urban park in Bukit Batok, Singapore. It is situated near Bukit Batok East Avenue 2, Bukit Batok East Avenue 6, and Lorong Sesuai.

History

The park was developed on an abandoned quarry site in 1988.

See also
Bukit Batok Town Park
List of parks in Singapore

References

External links

National Parks Board, Singapore

 

Parks in Singapore